John Fitzgerald Kness (born 1969) is a United States district judge of the United States District Court for the Northern District of Illinois. Prior to becoming a judge, Kness served as General Counsel of the College of DuPage.

Education 

Kness earned his Bachelor of Arts from Northwestern University and his Juris Doctor, cum laude, from the Northwestern University Pritzker School of Law.

Legal career 

Kness has spent his legal career engaged approximately equally in private practice and in criminal prosecution. In the private sector, Kness worked mostly in general litigation. As a prosecutor, Kness worked exclusively on criminal prosecutions. Kness handled seven jury and one bench trials, all criminal.

He has experience in law enforcement, having served as a patrol officer for the Oak Park Police Department prior to law school. After graduating law school, Kness served as a law clerk to Judge William H. Pryor Jr. of the United States Court of Appeals for the Eleventh Circuit from 2004 to 2005. From 2009 to 2016, he served as an Assistant United States Attorney in the Northern District of Illinois, with stints in the National Security and Cybercrimes, Narcotics, and General Crimes Sections.

From 2016 to 2020, he served as the General Counsel of the College of DuPage, where he oversaw all legal matters at the second-largest institution of higher learning in Illinois.

Federal judicial service 

On June 11, 2019, President Donald Trump announced his intent to nominate Kness to serve as a United States district judge for the United States District Court for the Northern District of Illinois. On June 24, 2019, his nomination was sent to the Senate. President Trump nominated Kness to the seat vacated by Judge Samuel Der-Yeghiayan, who retired on February 17, 2018. On July 17, 2019, a hearing on his nomination was held before the Senate Judiciary Committee. On October 17, 2019, his nomination was reported out of committee by a 19–3 vote. On February 11, 2020, the United States Senate voted 
82–12 to invoke cloture on his nomination. On February 12, 2020, his nomination was confirmed by an 81–12 vote. He received his judicial commission on February 18, 2020.

Memberships 

He has been an intermittent member of the Federalist Society since 2004.

References

External links 
 

1969 births
Living people
20th-century American lawyers
21st-century American lawyers
21st-century American judges
American police officers
Assistant United States Attorneys
Federalist Society members
Illinois lawyers
Judges of the United States District Court for the Northern District of Illinois
Lawyers from Chicago
Northwestern University alumni
Northwestern University Pritzker School of Law alumni
United States district court judges appointed by Donald Trump